The Galleria Civica d'Arte Moderna e Contemporanea di Latina or The Modern and Contemporary Civic Gallery in Latina, in the Region of Lazio, is an Italian Pinacoteca (Paintings Museum).

It was instituted in 1937 as Littoria Pinacoteca (Antic Latina’s name) and its original centre was realised thanks to works donated by various artists participating at the XX Venice Biennale and at the II Roman Quadriennale.

During the war, and after the September 8th armistice in 1943, most of the collection was lost. In December 1994, with those few paintings left together with those recovered by Carabinieri Force, the Gallery reopened to the public at the Palace of Culture in Latina

In 1996 began the acquisition process that expanded the initial chronological boundary, connecting the existing collection to contemporary art, and enriching the collection of several hundred paintings.

In 1999 a specific contemporary art section was created, which includes paintings created after 1955.

Collection 
Some artists exhibited in the permanent collection:

Ugo Attardi
Corrado Cagli
Domenico Cantatore
Salvatore Fiume
Marino Marini
Guido Marzulli
Plinio Nomellini
Aligi Sassu
Gregorio Sciltian
Arturo Tosi
Ernesto Treccani
Achille Vertunni

References

Art museums and galleries in Lazio
Museums in Lazio
Latina, Lazio
Art museums established in 1937
1937 establishments in Italy
Contemporary art galleries in Italy